A variety of supranational environmental agencies, commissions, programs and secretariats exist across the world today. Some are global in nature, others regional; they may be multi- or bilateral in character. Some are responsible for broad areas of environmental policy, regulation and implementation; others for very specific issue areas. This article lists notable supranational environmental agencies, by region.

Global

United Nations 

 Food and Agriculture Organization
 Global Environment Facility
 United Nations Convention on the Law of the Sea
 International Seabed Authority
 International Tribunal for the Law of the Sea
 United Nations Convention to Combat Desertification Secretariat
 United Nations Environment Programme
 United Nations Framework Convention on Climate Change Secretariat
 World Meteorological Organization

Other 

 Alliance of Small Island States
 Intergovernmental Panel on Climate Change
 Intergovernmental Science-Policy Platform on Biodiversity and Ecosystem Services
 International Carbon Action Partnership
 International Tropical Timber Organization
 International Union for Conservation of Nature
 International Whaling Commission
 North Atlantic Marine Mammal Commission
 OECD Environment Directorate
 World Nature Organization

Africa 
 Central African Forest Commission
 Congo Basin Forest Partnership

Americas and Caribbean 
 Comissão de Integração Nacional, Desenvolvimento Regional e da Amazônia - CINDRA, Brazil
 Commission for Environmental Cooperation, operating under the North American Free Trade Agreement
The Forum of Ministers of Environment of Latin America and the Caribbean, part of UNEP's Regional office in Latin America and the Caribbean
 International Joint Commission, prevents and resolves disputes about the use and quality of boundary waters on the Canada–US border

Antarctica 
 Antarctic Treaty Secretariat

Asia 
 ASEAN Wildlife Enforcement Network
 International Network for Bamboo and Rattan (INBAR)
 Mekong River Commission
 Partnerships in Environmental Management for the Seas of East Asia (PEMSEA)

Europe

European Union 
 European Commission
 Directorate-General for Climate Action
 Directorate-General for Energy
 Directorate-General for the Environment
 Directorate-General for Maritime Affairs and Fisheries
 European Environment Agency

Other 
 Baltic Marine Environment Protection Commission (HELCOM)
 Mediterranean Science Commission (CIESM) 
 International Council for the Exploration of the Sea (ICES)
 European Forest Institute
 International Commission for the Protection of the Danube River
 Regional Environmental Center for Central and Eastern Europe

Oceania 
 Pacific Islands Forum Fisheries Agency
 Pacific Regional Environment Programme

See also 
 List of agriculture ministries
 List of environmental ministries
 List of environmental organizations
 List of forestry ministries
 List of intergovernmental organizations
 List of international environmental agreements
 Supranational union

References

External links 
 World Nature Organization

Environmental agencies
Supranational
 
International environmental law
Supranational
Supranational